The SUVP was a high wing passenger aircraft. It was built in 1925 at the Krasny Letchik factory in Russia. Its fuselage was composed of metal tubing, its skin was fabric, and the wings were constructed out of wood. Only one aircraft was ever produced, and this aircraft saw service with a Ukrainian airline.

Specifications (SUVP)

External links
 

1920s Soviet and Russian airliners
Grigorovich aircraft